Schauenburg Castle can refer to three different castles:
Neu-Schauenburg Castle, the older ruined castle in Switzerland
Alt-Schauenburg Castle, the newer ruined castle in Switzerland
Schauenburg Castle (Oberkirch), a ruined castle in Oberkirch, Germany

See also
 Schaumburg (disambiguation)